The Power Loom Tenters' Trade Union of Ireland was a trade union representing workers involved in stretching linen being manufactured in the Belfast area of Ireland.

The union was founded in 1877 as the Belfast and North of Ireland Power Loom Tenters and grew slowly, having only 146 members in 1880, but 452 in 1915, and more than 500 in the 1930s.  It was based at Engineers' Hall on College Street in Belfast, where the Flax Roughers' and Yarn Spinners' Trade Union and Flax Dressers' Trade Union also had their headquarters.

In 1937, the union merged into the Transport and General Workers' Union.

General Secretaries
1910s: W. J. McDowell
H. Kelso
S. Millar

See also

 Transport and General Workers' Union
 TGWU amalgamations

References

Defunct trade unions of Ireland
Textile and clothing trade unions
Trade unions established in 1877
Trade unions disestablished in 1937
Transport and General Workers' Union amalgamations
Trade unions in Northern Ireland
1877 establishments in Ireland